Football Club Al Tahrir is an Eritrean football club based in Asmara.

Achievements
Eritrean Premier League: 2
1997, 2007

Performance in CAF competitions
CAF Champions League: 1 appearance
2008 – First Round

Current squad

See also
Football in Eritrea

References

Football clubs in Eritrea